The Romanian automobile manufacturer Dacia has produced a number of vehicles since its inception in 1966. Since becoming a part of Groupe Renault in 1999, many of its vehicles have also been rebadged under the Renault marque.

Current production vehicles

Former production vehicles 
 1968-72 1100
 1969-79 1300
 1970-74 1301
 1974-76 D6
 1975-82 1302
 1979-2004 1310
 1979-2006 1304
 1980-82 2000
 1983-95 Duster
 1985-89 1320
 1985-2006 1305
 1988-91 500 Lătsun
 1990-96 1325 Liberta
 1992-2006 1307
 1992-97 1309
 1994-99 Nova
 2000-02 SupeRNova
 2003-05 Solenza
 2007-12 Logan Van
 2008-12 Logan Pickup
 2006-20 Logan MCV
 2012-21 Dokker
 2012-21 Lodgy

Concept vehicles 
 1980 Braşovia
 2006 Logan Steppe
 2007 Logan S2000
 2009 Duster
 2020 Dacia Spring
 2021 Dacia Bigster
 2022 Dacia Manifesto

See also 
 Automobile Dacia
 Renault
 Automotive industry in Romania

References 

Automobile Dacia
Dacia
Renault